Eloise A. Vitelli (born 1949) is the majority leader of the Maine Senate. She is a Democrat representing Senate District 24, which serves all of Sagadahoc County and the adjacent town of Dresden, Maine in Lincoln County. Vitelli was first elected to the Maine Senate in a 2013 special election, but lost her re-election bid in 2014. She was re-elected in 2016, 2018 and 2020. Vitelli began working as an entrepreneurship trainer in the early 1980s and was the director of program and policy for New Ventures Maine for 38 years. She became the Assistant Senate Majority Leader in December 2020, and Majority Leader in February 2021.

Early life and education
Vitelli was born in 1949 in Trenton, New Jersey, the third of five children. Her father was a college professor and her mother was an art teacher. Vitelli grew up in Easton, Pennsylvania. but the family also lived in Italy and India when Vitelli was a child.

Vitelli has also studied and traveled in Europe, Asia and Africa. She received a Bachelor of Arts in political science from the University of Pittsburgh in 1971 and a Master of Science in education counseling from the University of Southern Maine in 1979.

In the early 1970s, both Vitelli and her parents moved to midcoast Maine to be near friends who lived in Damariscotta. Vitelli lived in Newcastle and Phippsburg before settling in Arrowsic with her husband in 1978. She worked as an early childhood Head Start teacher in Waldoboro, Nobleboro, and Brunswick.

Vitelli began working in entrepreneurship training in 1983, focusing on projects and organizations that developed women entrepreneurs. In 2018, she retired after 38 years as the director of program and policy for Maine Centers for Women, Work and Community, now called New Ventures Maine.

Maine Senate
Vitelli was first elected to the Maine Senate in an August 2013 special election after Senate Majority Leader Seth Goodall resigned to accept a presidential appointment overseeing the New England region of the Small Business Administration. Vitelli won the three-way race with 50.5% of the vote.

In 2014, Vitelli ran for re-election but was defeated by Republican Linda Baker.

In November 2016, Vitelli ran for the Senate again and beat Republican Guy Lebida with 52.9% of the vote. She defeated Republican Richard Donaldson in 2018 and Republican Holly Kopp in 2020. Vitelli was selected to be the Assistant Senate Majority Leader in December 2020, and in February 2021, when majority leader Nate Libby stepped down from the leadership position, Vitelli was named majority leader. She was re-elected Senate Majority Leader following the November 2022 elections. Vitelli serves on the Government Oversight and the Energy, Utilities & Technology committees.

Personal life
Vitelli and her husband, journalist Bob Kalish, have two adult sons, Sam and Will. Vitelli enjoys gardening, reading, camping and hiking, and has climbed Mount Katahdin 10 times.

Awards & honors
1986 co-recipient, Women's Business Advocate of the Year award, Maine Small Business Administration 
1995 inductee into the Maine Women's Hall of Fame
1997 Women's Business Advocate of the Year
2006 McGillicuddy Award for Entrepreneurial Excellence, Maine Small Business Administration

Electoral record

Notes

References

External links
Maine Senate Democrats: Eloise Vitelli
Senator Eloise Vitelli on Facebook
Eloise Vitelli's campaign website

1949 births
21st-century American politicians
21st-century American women politicians
Living people
Democratic Party Maine state senators
People from Sagadahoc County, Maine
People from Trenton, New Jersey
University of Pittsburgh alumni
University of Southern Maine alumni
Women state legislators in Maine